André Vida (born 1974) is Hungarian-American saxophonist, lyricist, avant-garde musician and experimental composer based in Berlin. Vida has been on the forefront of several major developments in experimental music, including his membership in Anthony Braxton’s original Ghost Trance Ensemble, as founding member of New York collective the CTIA, performances with The Tower Recordings and subsequent ‘freak folk’ groups.

Early life and education 
André Vida was born in 1974 in the United States. Throughout the 1990s, he played in bands with Anthony Braxton, a Professor of Music at Wesleyan University. In 1995, Vida moved to New York City and co-founded the Creative Trans-Informational Alliance Presents (CTIA) with Brandon Evans and Dominique Eade.

Vida graduated from Wesleyan University in 1997. He was awarded a M.F.A. degree in Experimental Sound Practices in 2005 from the School of Music at California Institute of the Arts (CalArts).

Career 
In 2001, Vida moved to Berlin and soon after launched the Kreuzberg suite, a once a week concert series with Vida and a frequently changing musical guest creating improvisational music around the subject of "Fish And Green".

His musical language is informed by an awareness of the human body and its limits. Vida worked in a collaboration with Anri Sala for the exhibition "3-2-1" at The Serpentine Gallery in London. Vida was scheduled to perform over 400 improvisational saxophone concerts over the course of 51 days (from October 1 to November 20, 2011).

Vida was an Eyebeam Honorary Fellow in 2013.

In 2013, as part of the Global Art Forum 7, Vida performed "Score" at the Mathaf: Arab Museum of Modern Art, challenging the question what if we spoke music instead of words?

2015 Sculpture Park, Frieze Art Fair London presented a live performance by Anri Sala in collaboration with André Vida. The piece is called To Each His Own (in Bridges), it is based on 74 pieces of music, combining fragments of jazz, folk, and pop songs played on the saxophone, clarinet and trombone.

In 2016, Vida participated in the art exhibition, "Anri Sala: Answer Me,” at the New Museum in New York City. Vida live improvises sound with his saxophone next to a video of Jemeel Moondoc’s performance, shot on the balcony of a building in Berlin.

Vida has collaborated with artists such as; Elton John, MV & EE, Anaïs Croze, Kevin Blechdom, Oni Ayhun, Tim Exile, Anri Sala, James Tenney, David Rosenboom, Sonny Simmons, Cecil Taylor, Lee Ranaldo, Heatsick, Jim O'Rourke, Dean Roberts, Tony Buck, Hildur Gudnadottir, Jimmy Edgar, Chilly Gonzales, Mocky, Tyshawn Sorey, Susie Ibarra, Guillermo E. Brown, and many others.

Discography

References

External links 
Official website
André Vida/Vidatone performances on YouTube
List of Vida's tracks on The Wire (magazine)
Video interview with André Vida on Vimeo from Eyebeam

21st-century American composers
American lyricists
American male saxophonists
Living people
Hungarian-American culture in New York (state)
1974 births
Avant-garde jazz composers
Avant-garde jazz musicians
California Institute of the Arts alumni
Musicians from New York City
Songwriters from New York (state)
21st-century American saxophonists
American male jazz composers
American jazz composers
21st-century American male musicians
Wesleyan University alumni
21st-century jazz composers
Jazz musicians from New York (state)
American male songwriters